Arthur J. Carty,  (born 12 September 1940), is a Canadian academic and former National Science Advisor to the Government of Canada.

Carty was the inaugural director of the Waterloo Institute for Nanotechnology at the University of Waterloo, special advisor to the President on international science and technology collaboration and research professor in the department of chemistry. From 2004-08, he served as Canada's first national science advisor to the prime minister and to the Government of Canada. Prior to his appointment as national science advisor, he was president of the National Research Council, Canada's leading knowledge and innovation organization, for ten years (1994-2004).

He earned a PhD in inorganic chemistry from the University of Nottingham. Before joining NRC in 1994, he spent two years at Memorial University and 27 years at the University of Waterloo where he was successively professor of chemistry, director of the Guelph-Waterloo Centre for Graduate Work in Chemistry, a pioneering joint graduate program, chair of the chemistry department and dean of research.

Carty maintains an active interest in research in organometallic chemistry and new materials. He has over 300 publications in peer reviewed journals and five patents to his credit. He is a former president of the Canadian Society for Chemistry, an honorary fellow of the Chemical Institute of Canada and of the Fields Institute for Research in the Mathematical Sciences and a fellow of the Royal Society of Canada.

Affiliations
 Atomic Energy Control Board (AECB) and its successor CNSC
 Council of the Canadian Space Agency
 Boards of Genome Canada
 MITACS
 The Stroke Network
 Networks of Centre of Excellence (NCE) and of Environment Canadand National Defense Research
 Founding Chairman of the Board of the Canadian Light Source (CLS; 1999-2008)
 Council of Japan's Science and Technology Forum in Society 
 International Advisory Boards of the APEC Centre for Technology Foresight and the Euroscience Open Forum (ESOF)
 Inaugural Canadian co-chair of the Joint S and T Cooperation Committee for the Canada-India science and technology agreement
 Member of the Advisory Board of Bilcare Global Clinical Services based in Pune, India
 Member of the Advisory Board of the Centre for Electron Microscopy at McMaster University
 Chairman of the Board of Innovative Materials Technologies (IMT)
 Member of the Board of Governors of Carleton University.

See also
 List of University of Waterloo people

References

External links

1940 births
Living people
Alumni of the University of Nottingham
Canadian chemists
Canadian university and college faculty deans
English expatriates in Canada
Fellows of the Royal Society of Canada
Academic staff of the Memorial University of Newfoundland
Officers of the Order of Canada
People from Rowlands Gill
Academic staff of the University of Ottawa
Academic staff of the University of Waterloo